Ariel Rodríguez may refer to:

Ariel A. Rodriguez (1947-2017), American judge
Ariel Rodríguez (footballer, born 1986), Costa Rican football midfielder
Ariel Rodríguez (footballer, born 1989), Costa Rican football forward